Stuart Robert Kennedy (born 31 May 1953) is a Scottish former footballer who played as a right-back for Falkirk and Aberdeen. He made eight appearances for the Scotland national team.

Club career
Kennedy was born in Grangemouth. He moved to Aberdeen in 1976 for £30,000 and featured prominently in Aberdeen's greatest period of success. A hard-working, skilful player, he won every major domestic honour in his time in the North-East, namely the League in 1979–80, the Scottish Cup in 1981–82, and the 1976–77 League Cup.

During the second leg of the European Cup Winners' Cup semi-final in 1983, Kennedy picked up a serious knee injury after catching his studs at the edge of the pitch. Having played in every game of Aberdeen's European campaign up to then, he was forced to watch from the dugout when his colleagues faced Real Madrid in the final in Gothenburg, Sweden. The Dons lifted the trophy after a 2–1 victory over the Spanish giants. Kennedy earned himself a place on the substitutes bench, despite being unable to play, thanks to an act of respect from his coach Alex Ferguson. The injury proved so serious that he never played professionally again.

International career
Kennedy was selected in the Scotland squad for the 1978 World Cup, where he played in the games against Peru and the Netherlands. He received eight caps in total in his three-year international career between 1978 and 1981.

Life after football

Since retiring, he has worked mainly as a publican in Falkirk.

Career statistics

Club

International

References

External links
 

1953 births
Living people
People from Grangemouth
Scottish footballers
Association football fullbacks
Footballers from Falkirk (council area)
Scotland international footballers
Scotland under-23 international footballers
Scottish Football League players
Falkirk F.C. players
Aberdeen F.C. players
1978 FIFA World Cup players